Lumbini Natural Park is a Buddhist temple located at Desa Dolat Rayat, Berastagi in North Sumatra. It was inaugurated with a great ceremony in October 2010. The ceremony was attended by more than 1,300 monks and more than 200 lay people from around the world. Taman Alam Lumbini is a replica of Shwedagon Pagoda in Yangon, Myanmar. The architecture is similar to a Myanmar pagoda, covered in gold. It hosts an elephant statue and the door appears like an Burmese craft.

History
The temple is based on the Shwedagon Pagoda in Myanmar. Construction began in 2007. The project was successfully completed in 2010. The replica is the second-highest among pagodas outside of Myanmar. This replica consists of:
 4 units Sakyamuni Buddha Statue made from Burmese green jade.

References

Buddhist temples in Indonesia
Tourist attractions in North Sumatra
Buildings and structures in North Sumatra
Religious buildings and structures completed in 2010
21st-century Buddhist temples